Grunting in tennis is a loud noise made by some players while hitting their shots. Such noises have sometimes been described as "shrieking" or "screaming".

Monica Seles, and Jimmy Connors and John McEnroe are generally considered to be the "grunt creators" in the women's and men's games, respectively. Examples of contemporary tennis players who grunt are Serena Williams, Venus Williams, Maria Sharapova, Victoria Azarenka, Aryna Sabalenka, Rafael Nadal, Andy Murray, Novak Djokovic, Carlos Alcaraz, Dominic Thiem, David Ferrer, and Gustavo Kuerten. However, some players such as Djokovic have reduced their grunting habits as their career has progressed.

Overview and punishment
In the 1988 US Open, Ivan Lendl complained about Andre Agassi's grunting: "When Agassi went for a big shot, his grunt was much louder. It threw off my timing". In the 2009 French Open, Aravane Rezaï complained to the umpire about Michelle Larcher de Brito's "shrieking", which led to a Grand Slam supervisor being brought to the court. No action was taken against Larcher de Brito and she was booed off the court. Afterwards former tennis player Martina Navratilova said that grunting was a form of cheating: "The grunting has reached an unacceptable level. It is cheating, pure and simple. It is time for something to be done". She also cited Roger Federer as an example of a successful player who does not grunt: "Roger Federer doesn't make a noise when he hits the ball—go and listen". The concern was not limited to mere distraction or unpleasantness. In particular, Navratilova was concerned that grunting drowned out the sound of the ball leaving the grunter's racquet and prevented an experienced opponent from using that clue as to force and spin to address his or her reception of the ball and the return stroke. Another former player, Chris Evert, stopped short of labelling it as cheating but said: "I wouldn't go that far [to say it's cheating] but I think the grunts are getting louder and more shrill now with the current players".

Some tennis players have defended grunting. Michelle Larcher de Brito, who had a reported decibel reading of 109, said: "If people don't like my grunting, they can always leave". In a different interview she said: "Nobody can tell me to stop grunting. Tennis is an individual sport and I'm an individual player. If they have to fine me, go ahead, because I'd rather get fined than lose a match because I had to stop grunting". Former Wimbledon champion Maria Sharapova stated, "I've done this ever since I started playing tennis and I'm not going to change". Serena Williams said that opponents grunting does not affect her: "I just play my game and sometimes I grunt and sometimes I don't. I'm not conscious when I'm doing it. I'm just zoned out. It doesn't really affect me if my opponent is [grunting]".

Some players and commentators have noted the connection with pro tennis trainer Nick Bollettieri, who has personally trained the majority of the controversially loud "grunters" including Larcher de Brito, Seles, Sharapova, Agassi, and the Williams sisters, leading to repeated accusations that he has been deliberately teaching grunting as a novel tactic in order to give his latest generation of students an edge in competitive play. Bollettieri has denied teaching grunting as a distraction tactic, and says grunting is natural, "I prefer to use the word 'exhaling'. I think that if you look at other sports, weightlifting or doing squats or a golfer when he executes the shot or a hockey player, the exhaling is a release of energy in a constructive way". In 2011, after Danish player Caroline Wozniacki (then world no. 1) publicly accused Bollettieri's students of cheating by grunting, Women's Tennis Association Chairman Stacy Allaster stated that the WTA would be "talking to the Bollettieri academy" about the predominance of loud grunters from that institution and how it could be eliminated from the next generation of players. One year later, a division of Bollettieri's academy released a document calling grunting "unsportsmanlike" and acknowledging that it obscures the sound of string impact (as noted by Navratilova), resulting in "an increase in an opponent's decision error, and a slower response time".

Louise Deeley, a sports psychologist at Roehampton University, believes that grunting is part of the rhythm for tennis players: "The timing of when they actually grunt helps them with the rhythm of how they're hitting and how they're pacing things". She also believes that banning grunting is not the solution: "They may feel, on the surface, that this is going to be a distraction to their game, that it is part and parcel of what they do". Bruce Lynne, a physiologist at University College London, believes that reflexes might have an effect: "If you're looking at reflexes in the legs and you ask someone to clench their jaw, then believe it or not, the reflexes in their legs get brisker, that's a well-known problem called re-enforcement".

References

External links
Acoustic analysis of tennis grunting

Tennis terminology
Tennis controversies
Human voice